Conservula alambica is a moth of the family Noctuidae. It is found in South Africa and in Cameroon.

References

Moths described in 1915
Amphipyrinae
Insects of Cameroon
Moths of Africa